Institutionalization is a concept in sociology.

It may also refer to:
 
 Committing someone to a psychiatric hospital
 Having the institutional syndrome, the psychological and mental health effects of living for a long time in an institution or similar

Music
 "Institutionalized" (song), a song on Suicidal Tendencies 1983 titular album
 "Institutionalized" (Kendrick Lamar song), 2015
 Institutionalized (album), a 2005 rap album by American rapper Ras Kass
 Institutionalized Vol. 2, a 2008 follow up album

See also 
 Institution
 Institutionalized discrimination